Eugene "Gino" Kenny (born 25 June 1972) is an Irish People Before Profit–Solidarity politician who has been a Teachta Dála (TD) for the Dublin Mid-West constituency since the 2016 general election.

He moved to Neilstown in 1979, where he lives with his partner. Before entering politics he worked as a carer for the elderly in several hospitals having acquired a Masters' in public health studies. He was a member of South Dublin County Council from 2009 until 2016, representing People Before Profit. He was elected to Dáil Éireann on his third attempt in February 2016. He had previously contested the general elections of 2007 and 2011, finishing ahead of sitting TD Paul Gogarty in the latter.

After being elected to the Dáil in 2016, he put forward a Private Member's Bill on the medicinal use of cannabis. After this Bill was rejected by an Oireachtas Committee for being poorly planned, he called the Dáil a "kip."

In May 2018 he accused Minister of State for Defence Paul Kehoe of having "blood on his hands" after the government purchased 4 Unmanned aerial vehicles from an Israeli manufacturer. Kenny suggested it was immoral for the Irish state to purchase military equipment from Israel because of questions over its civil rights record. Kehoe responded by saying the purchased UAVs had no offensive capacity and that the manufacturer had won the bid on the contract, and said that bids were open to any company not sanctioned or barred by the EU, UN or OSCE.

After looking set to lose his seat at the February 2020 general election (and indeed, conceding prematurely), Kenny retained it by unseating John Curran of Fianna Fáil in what RTÉ described as "one of the stories of this election with Gino Kenny's resurrection".

In October 2020 Kenny sponsored a "Dying with Dignity" Bill in the Dáil that proposed legalising assisted suicide in Ireland, an area he has been campaigning on for some time. It passed 81 votes to 71 following the government allowing a free vote on the matter. Following the vote, the Bill has moved to the committee stage.

In November 2022, Kenny introduced a bill in the Dáil that would legalise cannabis for personal use and possession of up to seven grams of cannabis.

References

 

1972 births
Irish Trotskyists
Irish cannabis activists
Irish socialists
Living people
Local councillors in South Dublin (county)
Members of the 32nd Dáil
Members of the 33rd Dáil
People Before Profit–Solidarity TDs